John Baretta (born May 6, 1955) is a Canadian retired soccer goalkeeper who played in the North American Soccer League, Major Indoor Soccer League and American Soccer League.

Baretta attended Eastern Illinois University where he was a 1978 All American soccer player. John was regarded as one of the all-time best at the collegiate level by renowned college coach Schellas Hyndman. 
In 1979, he turned professional with the Indianapolis Daredevils of the American Soccer League.  In 1980, he moved to the Edmonton Drillers of North American Soccer League. In 1983, he played with the Toronto Nationals of the Canadian Professional Soccer League. In November 1986, Baretta signed a ten-day contract with the Los Angeles Lazers. In 1987, he played with the Edmonton Brick Men. In 1987, he became an assistant coach with the Cleveland Force.  At the end of April 1988, the Force activated Baretta as a player after a series of injuries decimated the team's goalkeeper corps.  He continued to act as the backup goalkeeper into the playoffs, but never entered a game.  In the early 1990s, he returned to the Pacific Northwest where he coaches youth and high school soccer. He is now a teacher and health and fitness coach at Gray M.S.

On March 1, 2018, Baretta was hit by a car while walking home from Gray, suffering a traumatic brain injury and a broken left tibia.

References

External links
NASL stats

American Soccer League (1933–1983) players
Buffalo Stallions players
Canadian expatriate soccer players
Canadian expatriate sportspeople in the United States
Canadian soccer players
Cleveland Force (original MISL) players
Eastern Illinois Panthers men's soccer players
Edmonton Drillers (1979–1982) players
Expatriate soccer players in the United States
Indianapolis Daredevils players
Living people
Los Angeles Lazers players
Major Indoor Soccer League (1978–1992) coaches
Major Indoor Soccer League (1978–1992) players
North American Soccer League (1968–1984) indoor players
North American Soccer League (1968–1984) players
Soccer players from Edmonton
Tacoma Stars players
1955 births
Association football goalkeepers
Canadian soccer coaches
Edmonton Brick Men players
Toronto Nationals (soccer) players
Canadian Professional Soccer League (original) players